The Roman Catholic Diocese of Yei is a diocese located in the city of Yei in the Ecclesiastical province of Juba in South Sudan.

History
 March 21, 1986: Established as Diocese of Yei from Archdiocese of Juba

Leadership
 Bishops of Yei (Roman rite)
 Bishop Erkolano Lodu Tombe (1986.03.21-2022.02.11)
 Bishop Alex Lodiong Sakor Eyobo (since 2022.02.11)

See also
Roman Catholicism in South Sudan
Pojulu Tribe

Sources
 GCatholic.org
 Diocese of Yei website 

Yei
Yei
Roman Catholic dioceses and prelatures established in the 20th century
1986 establishments in Sudan